Villa Llao Llao is a village belonging to the municipality of San Carlos de Bariloche in Bariloche department of Río Negro Province in Argentina.

References

Populated places in Río Negro Province